Chejarla is a village in Palnadu district of the Indian state of Andhra Pradesh. It is located in Nekarikallu mandal of Narasaraopet revenue division.

History 
The village stands in the plains and is surrounded by a rocky hills and is covered by scrub jungle. The temple here is dedicated to Lord Siva and dates to the 4th or 5th century AD. The deity is called Kapotheswara.

Buddhism 
This story is a renowned one not only, in Hindu mythology, but also in the Buddhist Jataka tales, which give us the lives of Siddhartha, the Buddha, in his previous Janmas.  The Sibi Jataka is as hoary and sacred to the Buddhist, as an embodiment of 'Saranagata vatsala', as Sibi Chakravarti is to the Hindu, as a supreme symbol of 'Raja Dharma' which enjoins a king to protect the refugee even at the cost of his own life. It was a Buddhist Monastery later converted to a Hindu Shrine as per Historical evidences found.

Hinduism 

This is probably the only temple in the whole of India dedicated to Lord Siva as Kapotheswara. The deity is in Lingakara. Here Siva is represented as Kapotheswara, Lord Sibi who gave a portion of his own body in order to save a pigeon that took refuge with him. Curiously, in the imago of the Linga there are even today large cavities as if portions have been scooped or cut out, and these are said to be the places of the body, from which the Lord cut off his own flesh, in order to save the life of the Kapotha.

The image is said to be the image of the 'Kalebara' of Sibi, with the head cut off, and on top of the Linga, there are still two large vertical cavities. One of these cavities helps to drain off the Abhisheka Tirtha to an unknown place and even today the smell of raw flesh and blood comes out of this since the God here is a very powerful one. The temple is of the greatest importance to us from the point of view of temple architecture. There are, as is well known, three types of temple architecture.

Apsidal Temple 

The temple of Chezerla is a rare exception and this is a temple on the Apsidal model. This Apsidal plan and barrel vaulted structure, is classified in the VastuSastras, as 'Hasti prasta' or elephant back. These were originally Buddhist Chaityas and were readjusted for the purpose of Hindu worship, by the introduction of internal walls and upper store to seclude the Garbha Griha from the rest of the building. The end of the temple takes the form of an apse and in its centre is a white marble Linga.

The fact that the temple is sacred to Buddhism and Hinduism and is built in a unique style, the temple must have come into existence, at a period of mutual tolerance between Hinduism and Buddhism. A famous inscription in the temple further supports this.

A similar temple is the Trivikrama Temple at Ter, Maharashtra.

Governance 

Chejerla gram panchayat is the local self-government of the village. It is divided into wards and each ward is represented by a ward member.

Education 

As per the school information report for the academic year 2018–19, the village has a total of 3 Zilla Parishad/MPP schools.

References 

Villages in Guntur district
Buddhism in India